Janet Murguía (born September 6, 1960) is a civil rights activist in the United States. She is president of UnidosUS, formerly National Council of La Raza (NCLR), a Hispanic advocacy organization. Her twin sister Mary and elder brother Carlos are both federal judges.

National Council of La Raza
On January 1, 2005, Murguía replaced Raul Yzaguirre as the president and CEO of the National Council of La Raza (NCLR), the largest national Hispanic civil rights advocacy organization in the U.S. As President and CEO, Murguía often testifies before Congress about issues affecting the Latino community including education, health care, immigration reform, civil rights and the economy. In her role as a spokesperson for the organization, she is frequently interviewed by various news outlets and has appeared on many news programs. 
 

Murguía currently serves as a board member of the Independent Sector, a coalition of nonprofits, foundations, and corporations, and is an executive committee member of the Leadership Conference on Civil Rights. She also sits on the board of the Hispanic Association on Corporate Responsibility and the National Hispanic Leadership Agenda. Murguia serves on the advisory board of the National Hispanic University.

Murguía endorsed Democratic candidate Hillary Clinton in the 2016 U.S. presidential election.

Past positions held
In 2001, Murguía joined the University of Kansas (KU) as Executive Vice Chancellor for University Relations.  Murguía managed KU's strategic planning and marketing efforts on four campuses.

Before joining KU, she served as deputy campaign manager and director of constituency outreach for the Al Gore's presidential campaign during the 2000 presidential election where she was the primary liaison between former Vice President Gore and national constituency groups. She also served as a spokesperson for the campaign, working with radio, print, and TV media outlets.

Murguía served seven years as legislative counsel to former Kansas Congressman Jim Slattery before working at the White House from 1994 to 2000.  She eventually served as deputy assistant to President Bill Clinton, providing strategic and legislative advice to the president.  She also served as deputy director of legislative affairs where she was in charge of the legislative staff and acted as a senior White House liaison to Congress.

Honors 
In 2022, Murguía was named as one of USA Today's Women of the Year, which recognizes women who have made a significant impact.

References

External links
Biography from the NCLR
"First Person Singular" interview with Washington Post, December 6, 2009

1960 births
Activists for Hispanic and Latino American civil rights
American legal scholars
American people of Mexican descent
Assistants to the President of the United States
Clinton administration personnel
Kansas Democrats
Living people
People from Kansas City, Kansas
University of Kansas alumni
University of Kansas faculty